Perforated substance may refer to:

 Anterior perforated substance
 Posterior perforated substance